Satibhata Airstrip also known as Padmapur Airstrip, is located 6 km from the Padmapur city center in western Odisha, India. Nearest airport to this airstrip is Raipur's Swami Vivekananda Airport in the state of Chhattisgarh (137 km). The airport serves Padmapur city in the Bargarh district of Odisha.

References

Airports in Odisha
Bargarh district
Airports with year of establishment missing